Commercial Motor is a weekly magazine serving the road transport industry in the United Kingdom. Founded in 1905 by Edmund Dangerfield, it is notable for having been "the first journal to be devoted exclusively to the commercial vehicle engaged in the conveyance of goods or in passenger carrying".

Originally named The Commercial Motor, the title was shortened to Commercial Motor for the first issue of 1966. The publication is commonly referred to as 'CM' by its readers and editorial staff.

Commercial Motor was initially published by Temple Press and since 2011 it has been published by Road Transport Media, part of DVV Media Group.

Launch
The Commercial Motor was launched in March 1905 by Temple Press. In the leader of the first issue it described itself as a "missionary and educative medium".

For the first issue on 16 March, 20,000 copies were issued "in Britain and other countries, with the hope that the normal weekly circulation would be at least 5,000".

Composition
The content of Commercial Motor consists of editorial followed by classified advertising. The editorial part of the publication is subdivided into:

 'This Week': news section, including letters
 'Legal Digest': case reports, O-licence applications and decisions, upcoming training courses
 'Operations': features section, usually including a van or truck road test 
 'Used Trucks': news and features for used truck buyers and sellers

Online
Commercial Motor'''s website launched at the end of November 2011. Reflecting the print publication, it is a mixture of editorial content and classified advertising.

EventsCommercial Motor is an official media partner of the Commercial Vehicle Show.

In October 2012 a new event under the Commercial Motor'' brand called Commercial Motor Live was launched. Exhibitors at this event included truck manufacturers such as Mercedes-Benz and service suppliers to the road transport industry including Backhouse Jones. The event was held again in 2013.

References

External links
 Commercialmotor.com
 Commercial Motor Archive

1905 establishments in the United Kingdom
Transport magazines published in the United Kingdom
Weekly magazines published in the United Kingdom
English-language magazines
Magazines established in 1905